Carrù is a comune (municipality) in the Province of Cuneo in the Italian region Piedmont, located about  south of Turin and about  northeast of Cuneo.

Carrù borders the following municipalities: Bastia Mondovì, Bene Vagienna, Clavesana, Farigliano, Magliano Alpi, Mondovì, and Piozzo.
Luigi Einaudi, the first official republican President Italy, was born in Carrù. The town also  saw the passage of the troops of Napoleone Bonaparte during his campaign in Italy.

Fairs
Carrù is home to the "Sagra dell'uva" (the fair of the grape), which takes place in the end of September with dances and spectacles, and to "La fiera del bue grasso" (the fair of the fat ox).

Legend
There is a historic legend called "La dama blu" (the blue lady). The wife of the count of Carrù used to go hunting. One day she was out hunting wearing a blue dress and was killed by an arrow. It's said that every last Friday in the month this lady walks into her castle and haunts it, to find her murderer. The castle was open some days a year for trips, although it is now a bank.

References

External links
 http://www.comune.carru.cn.it/

Cities and towns in Piedmont